Paphiopedilum spicerianum is a species of flowering plant in the family Orchidaceae. It is said to be endemic to Assam (India) but might actually be rather widespread, though nowhere common, between Bhutan and northwestern Myanmar.

References 

 Braem, G. & Chiron, G. Paphiopedilum, Tropicalia, France, 2003.
 Cribb, P. The Genus Paphiopedilum, Second Edition, Natural History Publications (Borneo) Sdn. Bhd., 1998.
 Russell, G. "Paphiopedilum spicerianum: unravelling some of the mystery", MIOS Journal vol. 9 iss. 4 (April 2008), pp. 2–11. http://miosjournal.org/journal/2008/04/PaphiopedilumSpicerianum.html
 Russell, G. "The Story of Paphiopedilum spicerianum", MIOS Journal vol. 9 iss. 5 (May 2008), pp. 12–16. http://miosjournal.org/journal/2008/05/PaphiopedilumSpicerianum2.html

External links 

spicerianum
Orchids of Assam